Shentalinsky may refer to:

People
 Vitaly Shentalinsky, Russian writer and journalist

Places
 Shentalinsky District, Samara Oblast, Russia